Strikeforce: Tate vs. Rousey was a mixed martial arts event that was held by Strikeforce. It took place on March 3, 2012 at the Nationwide Arena in Columbus, Ohio, United States.

Background
The event was expected to host the finals of Strikeforce's Heavyweight Grand Prix with Josh Barnett taking on Daniel Cormier, but the bout did not materialize due to Cormier's lingering hand injury. The finals were instead held at Strikeforce: Barnett vs. Cormier that May, where Cormier won the tournament via unanimous decision.

Gegard Mousasi was expected to face Mike Kyle at this event, but Kyle withdrew due to injury. The bout was rescheduled for Strikeforce: Marquardt vs. Saffiedine the following January, where Mousasi submitted Kyle in the first round.

Derek Brunson was scheduled to face Ronaldo Souza on this card.  However, the Ohio State Athletic Commission denied Brunson's fight license based on an eye exam he had submitted. Bristol Marunde signed as his replacement. The Souza/Brunson bout was rescheduled for Strikeforce: Rousey vs. Kaufman that August, where Souza won via first-round knockout.

Results

Reported Payout
The following is the reported payout to the fighters as reported to the Ohio Athletic Commission.

Ronda Rousey: $32,000 (includes $17,000 win bonus) def. Miesha Tate: $19,000
Josh Thomson: $80,000 (no win bonus) def. K. J. Noons: $38,000
Kazuo Misaki: $50,000 (no win bonus) def. Paul Daley: $45,000
Lumumba Sayers: $10,000 (includes $5,000 win bonus) def. Scott Smith: $15,000
Ronaldo Souza: $92,000 (includes $22,000 win bonus) def. Bristol Marunde: $10,000
Sarah Kaufman: $25,000 (includes $10,000 win bonus) def. Alexis Davis: $4,000
Roger Bowling: $16,000 (includes $8,000 win bonus) def. Brandon Saling: $5,000
Pat Healy: $22,500 (includes $5,000 win bonus) def. Carlos Fodor: $12,000
Ryan Couture: $10,000 (no win bonus) def. Conor Heun: $8,000

See also
Miesha Tate vs. Ronda Rousey

References

Tate vs. Rousey
2012 in mixed martial arts
Mixed martial arts in Ohio
Sports competitions in Columbus, Ohio
2012 in sports in Ohio
Events in Columbus, Ohio